Coniophora is a genus of fungi within the Coniophoraceae family. There are 20 species in the genus, which has a widespread distribution. One notable member is the cellar fungus (C. puteana), which causes wet rot in wood. Molecular analysis has revealed that there are cryptic species in the fungal lineages  Coniophora olivacea, C. arida, and C. puteana.

Species

C. arida	(Fr.) P.Karst.
C. capnoides	Ellis & Everh.
C. dimitica	G. Cunn.
C. elegans	Höhn.
C. eremophila	Lindsey & Gilb.
C. flava	Burt
C. fuscata	Bres. & Torrend
C. fusispora	(Cooke & Ellis) Cooke
C. hanoiensis	Pat.
C. harperi	Burt
C. ladoi	Tellería
C. lichenoides	Massee
C. marmorata	Desm.
C. matzuzawae	Yasuda
C. media	Bourdot & Galzin
C. merulioides	Falck
C. minor	G.Cunn.
C. mollis	Ginns
C. olivacea	(Fr.) P.Karst.
C. opuntiae	Tellería
C. prasinoides	(Bourdot & Galzin) Bourdot & Galzin
C. puteana	(Shum.: Fr.) P.Karst
C. submembranacea	(Berk. & Broome) Cooke

References

External links

Coniophoraceae
Boletales genera